Arisba or Arisbe was a town in ancient Lesbos, which Herodotus speaks of as being taken by the Methymnaei.  Pliny the Elder says it was destroyed by an earthquake.

It is located near modern Arisvi. The German survey in the late 19th century created the first and only topographic plan of the visible remains, which include megaron style houses (i.e. porch and main room).

References

Ancient Lesbos
Populated places in the ancient Aegean islands
Former populated places in Greece